Nine News (stylised 9News) is the national news service of the Nine Network in Australia. Its flagship program is the hour-long 6:00 pm state bulletin, produced by Nine's owned-and-operated stations in Sydney, Melbourne, Brisbane, Adelaide, Perth and Darwin. National bulletins also air on weekday mornings, weekend afternoons and most nights of the week after 10:30pm. In addition, a supplementary regional news program for the Gold Coast in Queensland airs each weeknight as well as regional bulletins for Northern NSW and the Gold Coast under the name of NBN News air seven nights a week.

Up until the mid-2000s, Nine News was generally the highest-rating news service in Australia, but in 2005 it was overtaken by the rival Seven News before it regained the lead on a national basis in 2013. The network's Director of News and Current Affairs is Darren Wick.

National bulletins

Nine News: Early Edition
Nine News: Early Edition is a half-hour bulletin airing at 5:00am on weekdays, presented from TCN studios in North Sydney by Alex Cullen.

The bulletin was originally pre-recorded and was presented as the "AM Edition" of the Qantas Inflight News, a daily news bulletin for passengers of Qantas airways. Early morning bulletins were introduced in the early 1990s as Daybreak and, later, National Nine Early News until 2003 when Today was extended to begin at 6am. The Early News resumed for a brief time at 6am in February 2005 and was presented by Sharyn Ghidella and Chris Smith before again being cancelled in July the same year. Amber Sherlock, Alicia Loxley, Belinda Russell, Julie Snook and Lara Vella have previously presented the bulletin. In mid-2014, Julie Snook replaced Belinda Russell to present. After two years in the role, Julie Snook was promoted to the sports department and Lara Vella replaced her.

In October 2014, a new era of the bulletin launched with its contract ending with Qantas. The bulletin was renamed Nine News: Early Edition with a dedicated 9news.com.au news feed on the right of screen, finance and weather flipper at the bottom, a look-ahead to Today and the presenter taking up less than three-quarters of the screen. There was a look at the newspaper front pages which showed the front pages of the Sydney and Melbourne papers The Australian, The Courier Mail and The Advertiser. There was even a live cross in which the bulletin prior to October was pre-recorded.

Nine Morning News
Nine Morning News airs at 11:30am on weekdays, presented from TCN studios in North Sydney by Mark Burrows on Monday and Davina Smith on Tuesday – Friday. Lizzie Pearl and Mark Burrows are the main fill in presenter with Jayne Azzopardi, Sophie Walsh and Kate Creedon also filling in from time to time.

The morning bulletin, originally known as National Nine Morning News, has been broadcast since 1981 and was originally presented by Eric Walters. The bulletin was extended from thirty minutes to a full hour on Monday 4 May 2009. From 2004 to October 2008 the bulletin was known as the Morning Edition, and until May 2009, was branded the AM Edition.

Local editions were previously produced for the Perth and Queensland markets – in March 2014, a local Perth edition was launched, accompanying the launch of Today Perth, but it was axed later that year. Between 2014 and 2017, a local edition was provided for the Queensland market, replacing the national bulletin in full. The local edition provided up to date news for the state, especially during daylight saving time on the South East Coast. This edition was axed in October 2017.

Nine News: First at Five

Nine News: First at Five airs at 5pm on Saturday and Sunday, presented from GTV studios in Docklands by Alicia Loxley and sport is presented by Clint Stanaway.

The bulletin was launched in January 2011 in response to Network Ten's decision to move its weekend evening bulletin to 6pm - the network reintroduced a 5pm news two months later. Nine News: First at Five does not air in Sydney and Brisbane on Sunday during the NRL season or when live sport is airing nationally in its time slot. The bulletin was originally presented from Sydney by Georgie Gardner (Saturday and Peter Overton (Sunday) and Ken Sutcliffe, but moved production to Melbourne in 2015.

Nine News Late
Nine News Late airs directly following 60 Minutes at or around 9:45 pm on Sunday and around 10:00 pm on Monday – Thursday, presented by Peter Overton from TCN studios in North Sydney (Sunday) and Michael Thomson from STW studios in Perth (Monday – Thursday) with weather presenter Scherri-Lee Biggs from STW studios in Perth (Sunday – Thursday). The bulletin was originally presented from former TCN studios in Willoughby by Peter Overton (Sunday – Thursday) and Georgie Gardner (Friday and Saturday), but weeknight production moved to Perth in May 2020.

Tracy Vo, Georgie Gardner, Davina Smith, Natalia Cooper and Amber Sherlock are some of the fill-in presenters for the bulletin.

Previously, the Nine Network had produced a late night news bulletin named Nightline, which was presented by various presenters, between 1992–2008 and again between 2009–2010. The bulletin was axed for a first time in 2008 due to budget cuts, before it was revived in 2009 and then axed again in 2010 due to declining ratings and commitments with televising live rugby league in the northern states, and Wimbledon in the southern states.

Nine News Updates
Short localised updates are presented during the afternoons by various state-based reporters or presenters.

National evening updates are presented on weeknights from Sydney. National late updates on weekends are presented from Perth, although these had previously been presented from Melbourne.

Online presence
Nine News''' website is named 9news.com.au. According to third-party web analytics providers Alexa and SimilarWeb, it is the 76th and 158th most visited website in Australia respectively, as of August 2015. SimilarWeb rates the site as the 19th most visited news website in Australia, attracting almost 4.8 million visitors per month.

 9News Lunch Podcast 9News Lunch Podcast is a podcast which provides listeners with the latest developments in local, national and international news. The 10-minute national news bulletin is presented by Nine Radio journalists Amie Meehan and Natalie Peters – working with the newsrooms of 2GB, 3AW, 4BC and 6PR – and utilises the resources of 9News’ team of journalists.

 9NewsWatch 9NewsWatch is an online bulletin streamed on Facebook at 8pm on weeknights, presented by Julie Snook. The bulletin premiered in August 2019 when the Nine Network announced its partnership with Facebook. Previously this bulletin was presented by Sylvia Jeffreys.

Ninemsn newsroomNinemsn newsroom was an online bulletin streamed at 12:30pm on weekdays, presented from Sydney. The bulletin was also available to be downloaded as a vodcast from the Ninemsn newsroom website. The bulletin was cancelled and replaced in 2013 with Nine News Now which airs on the network from 3.00pm.

Live streaming
In June 2008, live streaming of the 6pm bulletins in Sydney, Melbourne and Brisbane was introduced to the Nine News website. These bulletins can be viewed nationwide, regardless of the home market of the viewer. Nine Morning News and Nine Afternoon News (and later Nine News Now) are also streamed live online. As of 2014, Adelaide and Perth 6pm bulletins can also be viewed online. The ability to view live press conferences, and live feeds from various Nine News helicopters from around the country during a breaking or developing story was also added to the Nine News website.

Nine NewsbreakNine Newsbreak is an iPhone and iPad app that was launched in 2011. The app is constantly updated with videos from Nine's newsrooms around the country and overseas along with specially produced 60-second video reports and full video packages taken from Nine News bulletins. There is also a user generated functionality, enabling consumers to take a photo or video and send it via the app, direct to Nine's newsrooms. In 2013, Nine Newsbreak was merged into the Nine Network's 9Now app.

Capital-based bulletins

Afternoon news

National bulletin
Nine's national afternoon news bulletin was launched in 2004 as Afternoon Edition in response to the launch of a 4:30 pm bulletin on Seven the year before, brought about by extended coverage of the invasion of Iraq. On 29 June 2009, the bulletin was replaced by an hour long news magazine program, This Afternoon, which was axed after 12 programs due to poor ratings. The half-hour bulletin returned on 15 July 2009 and was extended to 60 minutes in November 2010 as Nine Afternoon News.

Past presenters of the national bulletin include Georgie Gardner (2004), Mike Munro (2005–2006), Kellie Sloane (2006–2008), Leila McKinnon (2008), Wendy Kingston (2008–2009), Alicia Loxley (2011), Mark Ferguson (2009), Wendy Kingston (2009–2012), Amelia Adams (2012–2014) and Davina Smith (2014–2016).

A separate edition for Western Australia was introduced on 14 March 2012 and is simulcast on WIN Television in regional WA. Regional news coverage is incorporated into the bulletin following WIN's decision to end separate WIN News bulletins for regional Western Australia. The local bulletin was axed in July 2013 but latterly reintroduced as a thirty-minute addition to the national bulletin on Monday 7 October 2013.

Thirty minute additions to the national bulletin were introduced in both Queensland and Adelaide in 2014.

Local bulletins
In 2017, following the extension of Millionaire Hot Seat to 60 minutes, the Western Australian, South Australian and Queensland bulletins were reformatted to statewide, hour-long 4:00 pm bulletins under the brand Nine Live to replace the national bulletin in full. On 1 May 2017, Victoria received its own local hour-long bulletin while the former national bulletin was reformatted to serve New South Wales. Both Victoria and New South Wales retained the Nine Afternoon News brand.

The afternoon news bulletins currently air at 4pm on weekdays in three separate local editions; local news block starts at 5pm in Adelaide and Perth.

 Nine Afternoon News Sydney is presented from TCN studios in North Sydney by Mark Burrows (Monday) and Davina Smith (Tuesday – Friday) and weather presenters Amber Sherlock (Monday – Thursday) and Belinda Russell (Friday). The bulletin is simulcast across New South Wales and the ACT through Nine O&O NBN in Northern NSW and Nine affiliate WIN Television in Southern New South Wales, the ACT, and Griffith. Fill-in presenters includes Mark Burrows and Lizzie Pearl.
 Nine Afternoon News Melbourne is presented from GTV studios in Docklands by Alicia Loxley (Monday and Tuesday) and Dougal Beatty (Wednesday – Friday) with sport presenter Clint Stanaway and weather presenters Livinia Nixon (Monday – Thursday) and Madeline Spark (Friday). The bulletin is simulcast across regional Victoria, Tasmania and Mildura through Nine affiliate WIN Television. Fill-in presenters include Chris Kohler, Stephanie Anderson and Christine Ahern (news) and Alicia Muling (sport).
 Nine Afternoon News Queensland  is presented from QTQ studios in Mount Coot-tha by TBD (Monday – Wednesday) and Alison Ariotti (Thursday and Friday) with sport presenters Jonathan Uptin and weather presenters Garry Youngberry (Monday – Thursday) and Luke Bradnam (Friday). The bulletin is simulcast across regional Queensland and the Gold Coast through Nine O&Os NBN, NTD in Darwin and Nine affiliates WIN Television and remote eastern and central Australia on Imparja Television. Fill-in presenters includes Alison Ariotti.
 Nine News at Five: Adelaide is presented from NWS studios in Adelaide by Will McDonald (Monday – Wednesday) and Edward Godfrey (Thursday and Friday), sport presenter Tom Rehn, and weather presenter Jessica Braithwaite. Fill-in presenters include Edward Godfrey and Tom Rehn.  The bulletin is simulcast across South Australia through affiliates WIN SA and Southern Cross Nine GDS/BDN. 
 9News WA First: Perth is presented from STW studios in Perth by Monika Kos with sport presenters Matthew Pavlich (Monday – Thursday) and Paddy Sweeney (Friday) and weather presenters Scherri-Lee Biggs (Monday – Thursday) and Elizabeth Creasy (Friday). Creasy is also the main weather fill-in. The bulletin is simulcast across Western Australia through affiliate WIN Television. The Pulse is a daily segment which takes a light hearted look at the days news from the points of view of local personalities.

Nightly news

Sydney (New South Wales)Nine News Sydney is presented from the TCN studios in North Sydney by Peter Overton (Sunday – Thursday) and Georgie Gardner (Friday and Saturday) with sport presenters James Bracey (Sunday – Thursday) and Roz Kelly (Friday and Saturday) and weather presenters Amber Sherlock (Sunday – Thursday) and Belinda Russell (Friday and Saturday).

Between 2008–2020, the evening bulletin was simulcast on local radio station Hope 103.2, until Hope Media launched their news service.

The Sydney bulletin was presented by Brian Henderson for 38 years – a record that still stands today. Henderson retired in November 2002, with then Sunday and weekend presenter Jim Waley taking over as weeknight anchor. Despite winning the 2003 and 2004 ratings seasons (the former by a margin of over 100,000 viewers), Waley was replaced three years later by weekend presenter Mark Ferguson, after which National Nine News started to lose its long-time ratings lead in Sydney to the rival Seven News, winning just one (out of 40) ratings week in 2005 (a huge, negative turnaround from winning all 40 ratings weeks in 2003).

Peter Overton became Nine's Sydney anchor in January 2009, with Ferguson returning to his former weekend role (replacing Michael Usher and his predecessor Mike Munro).

In 2011, Nine News overtook Seven News in Sydney in the ratings for the first time in seven years, winning 26 weeks to Seven's 14 weeks.

In December 2016, long-time sports presenter Ken Sutcliffe retired after 34 years of presenting the sport; he was replaced by Cameron Williams.

In December 2017, Deborah Knight was appointed as presenter of Nine News Sydney on Friday and Saturday nights replacing Georgie Gardner who replaced Lisa Wilkinson on Today.

In January 2019, Knight was appointed co-host of Today and continued to present Nine News Sydney until December.

In January 2020, Georgie Gardner returned to presenting the Nine News Sydney bulletin on the weekends, replacing Knight who went onto to hosting the afternoon show on 2GB.

In December 2021, weekend sports presenter Erin Molan resigned from the network after 11 years. James Bracey was later announced as her replacement.

In March 2022, Cameron Williams resigned after 16 years at the Nine Network for personal reasons. James Bracey replaced Williams with Roz Kelly replacing Bracey as weekend sports presenter.

Fill-in presenters for the bulletin include Mark Burrows and Jayne Azzopardi (news), Emma Lawrence and Danika Mason (sport) and Airlie Walsh and Kate Creedon (weather).

Melbourne (Victoria statewide)Nine News Melbourne is presented from the GTV studios in Docklands by Peter Hitchener (Monday – Thursday) and Alicia Loxley (Friday – Sunday) with sport presenters Tony Jones (weeknights) and Clint Stanaway (weekends) and weather presenters Livinia Nixon (Monday – Thursday) and Madeline Spark (Friday –  Sunday).

The late Brian Naylor presented National Nine News Melbourne for 20 years from 1978 following his resignation from HSV-7 to 1998. Following his retirement, he was succeeded by Peter Hitchener as weeknight presenter, while Jo Hall took over from Hitchener as weekend presenter. Hall scaled back her work with Nine to news updates and fill-in duties in November 2011, with Weekend Today newsreader Alicia Loxley taking over as weekend presenter. Rob Gell formerly presented the weather until 2003, when he was replaced by Nixon; Gell subsequently defected to the rival Seven News Melbourne bulletin presenting the weather on weekends.

For many decades, Nine News Melbourne was the most dominant local news service, often drawing a peak audience of more than 400,000 viewers. However, in the mid-2000s, the bulletin started to lose ground to the rival Seven News Melbourne, winning only 24 (out of 40) weeks in 2006 and then narrowly losing in 2007 when it won 19 weeks (to Seven's 20 weeks, with the other week tied). Even during the years when Nine News struggled nationally, the Melbourne bulletin remained competitive, being the only metropolitan bulletin to win any weeks against Seven News in 2008 and 2009.

In March 2011, the GTV studios moved their base from Bendigo Street, Richmond, to a new building in Bourke Street, Docklands.

In December 2021, it was announced that Peter Hitchener will scale back to 4 days a week from January 2022 presenting from Monday to Thursday with Alicia Loxley presenting on Friday.

Fill-in presenters for the bulletin include Alicia Loxley, Dougal Beatty and Stephanie Anderson (news), Alicia Muling and Braden Ingram (sport), Stephanie Anderson, Justine Conway and Madeline Spark (weather).

Brisbane (Queensland statewide)Nine News Queensland is presented from the QTQ studios in Mount Coot-tha by Andrew Lofthouse and Melissa Downes (weeknights) and Mia Glover (weekends) with sport presenters Jonathan Uptin (weeknights) and Michael Atkinson (weekends) and weather presenters Garry Youngberry (Sunday – Thursday) and Luke Bradnam (Friday and Saturday).

The 6pm bulletin is simulcast in Brisbane on commercial radio station River 94.9 and throughout remote eastern and central Australia on Imparja Television.

Bruce Paige and Heather Foord co-anchored the 6pm bulletin from 1995 until 2001, when Foord joined Mike London as a weekend anchor and Jillian Whiting replaced her on weeknights. London resigned in June 2003 after allegations emerged that he had organised a female friend to complain about the presentation of weeknight anchor Bruce Paige.

Foord resigned as weeknight anchor on 5 December 2008 and was replaced by Melissa Downes on weeknights with Eva Milic and former ABC newsreader Andrew Lofthouse fronting weekend bulletins. A year later, Bruce Paige retired from the weeknight chair (he was replaced by Lofthouse) and Heather Foord returned to present weekend bulletins solo for two years.

In February 2018, in a minor network reshuffle, weekend presenters Darren Curtis and Alison Ariotti were removed from presenting the weekend news; they were replaced by then-Nine News Regional Queensland presenter Jonathan Uptin

Despite these position changes over the past three decades, Nine News Queensland continues to retain a long-standing ratings lead ahead of 10 News First Queensland and Seven News Brisbane.

Paige returned to full-time news reading in January 2012, fronting Nine Gold Coast News solo until he was paired with Wendy Kingston in July 2016.

As of September 2017, the Brisbane weekend bulletins are simulcast in the Darwin area on weekends.

In January 2023, long-serving sports presenter Wally Lewis resigned from the role, citing health concerns. He was replaced by Jonathan Uptin. Mia Glover replaced Uptin as weekend news presenter.

AdelaideNine News Adelaide is presented from the NWS studios in Adelaide by Kate Collins and Brenton Ragless (weeknights) and Will McDonald (weekends) with sport presenters Tom Rehn (weeknights) and Corey Norris (weekends) and weather presenters Jessica Braithwaite (weeknights) and Chelsea Carey (weekends).

The weeknight bulletins are simulcast on local radio station 107.9 Life FM and nightly across the Riverland and South West regions of South Australia on WIN Television SDS/RDS and is shown in the Spencer Gulf and Broken Hill in New South Wales on Southern Cross Nine GDS/BDN.

Rob Kelvin and Kevin Crease presented the Adelaide edition of National Nine News from 1988 until 2007, making them one of the longest serving news presenting teams in Australia, until Crease died of cancer in 2007. Caroline Ainslie previously presented the news with Kelvin until 1987. Georgina McGuinness was the weekend presenter between 1989 and 2011, during which her bulletins consistently rated higher than the rival Seven News Adelaide in its timeslot.

In 2015, Nine News Adelaide started to achieve regular nightly victories over the rival Seven News Adelaide.

In May 2018, long-standing news director Tony Agars was removed after fifteen years in the role.

Throughout the 1990s, Deanna Williams was the main fill-in presenter and state political reporter. Following Kevin Crease's death in 2007, Kelvin was partnered with Kelly Nestor, whose contract was terminated two years later. Kelvin retired on New Year's Eve 2010, but was brought out of retirement in 2014 as the presenter of the local afternoon news bulletin.

PerthNine News Perth is presented from the STW studios in Perth by Michael Thomson (weeknights) and Tracy Vo (weekends) with sport presenters Matthew Pavlich (Monday – Thursday) and Paddy Sweeney (Friday – Sunday) and weather presenters Scherri-Lee Biggs (Sunday – Thursday) and Elizabeth Creasy (Friday and Saturday).

The 6pm bulletin is simulcast each weekday on local radio station Sunshine 98.5FM and nightly across regional Western Australia on WIN Television. Fill-in presenters include Tracy Vo, Jerrie Demasi and Elizabeth Creasy.

Dixie Marshall presented the weeknight bulletin between 2002 and May 2011, alongside Sonia Vinci as Australia's first duo female news presenting team for five years until early 2008, when Vinci was replaced by Greg Pearce. Natalia Cooper was a weather presenter for Nine News Perth until her resignation in June 2008.

In December 2019, it was announced that Nine Live Perth presenter Tracy Vo will move to Sydney to host Today as a news presenter. Louise Momber will appear on Monday, Tuesday, Wednesday and Jerrie Demasi will appear on Wednesday, Thursday and Friday presenting Nine Live Perth.

In March 2020, Vo returned to Perth due to the COVID–19 pandemic and will continue to present the weekend bulletins, replacing Louise Momber.

Local Weekend bulletins Nine News Perth Saturday and Nine News Perth Sunday air at 6pm. Sharlyn Sarac and Matt Tinney previously presented weekend bulletins until Sarac resigned in 2010. Tinney left a year later to present WIN News in regional Western Australia, now Tinney presents on TVW on Seven News Perth Sunrise cut-ins.

 Darwin Nine News Darwin is a regional news service for Darwin, Palmerston and the surrounding areas, presented by Paul Murphy. Launched in 1982 as Eight News at Seven, the bulletin airs at 6:00pm weeknights on Nine's owned-and-operated station, NTD. Whilst the news reports are filed by reporters from the NTD newsroom in Darwin, it is presented live from the QTQ studios in Brisbane; this was as a result of the relocation of studio presentation in September 2017, after the bulletin was folded into its regional Queensland operations. Weekend bulletins are a delayed broadcast of Nine News Queensland, with no local opt-outs. The weeknight bulletin is also simulcast on local Darwin radio station 104.1 Territory FM and on Imparja 9Gem in areas outside of NTD's broadcasting area.

Following the rollout of the regional composite bulletins as part of the affiliation relationship between Nine and Southern Cross Austereo in 2016, local studio production of the Darwin bulletin ceased on 8 September 2017, with the bulletin folded into the Brisbane-based regional Queensland operations. Darwin henceforth received a delayed broadcast of the Brisbane bulletin on weekends. Jonathan Uptin joined the regional Queensland bulletins, co-presenting alongside Samantha Heathwood upon the transfer. Between 11 September 2017 and 16 March 2020, Nine News Darwin was recorded and presented as a composite bulletin with regional Queensland, with opt-outs for local news, sport and weather.

In February 2018, Uptin ceased co-presenting the regional Queensland and Darwin bulletins and was moved to presenting the weekend news on the metropolitan Brisbane bulletin. In addition he also became the weekday sports editor for the bulletin. Paul Taylor replaced Uptin as co-presenter alongside Heathwood while Paul Murphy was appointed to replace Taylor as sports presenter.Nine News Darwin was suspended, along with other regional composite bulletins, on 17 March 2020, due to the COVID-19 pandemic. On 5 October 2020, the bulletin relaunched as a live, standalone bulletin from the QTQ studios.

Previous presenters of the bulletin have included Jonathan Uptin, Tim Arvier and Charles Croucher. Uptin and Arvier are now both on Nine News Queensland as the weeknight sports presenter and state political/investigative reporter, respectively, while Croucher is now Chief Political Editor.

Nine is the only commercial network, and one of two networks to produce a local news bulletin for Darwin; the other broadcaster being the ABC.

 Regional bulletins 
 Gold Coast Nine Gold Coast News is a regional news service for the Gold Coast, presented by Eva Milic and Paul Taylor with sport presenter Erin Buchan and weather presenter Luke Bradnam, also additionally presents boating and fishing-related news. Launched in 1996, the bulletin airs at 5:30pm on weeknights on QTQ's Gold Coast transmitters, before the 6pm Brisbane edition of Nine News. Produced from the network's studios at Surfers Paradise, the Gold Coast bulletin is also simulcast on local Gold Coast radio station Juice107.3. Tracey Atkins is the main fill-in news presenter, with Luke Bradnam the main fill-in weather presenter.

Previous presenters of the bulletin have included Bruce Paige, Karl Stefanovic, Natalie Gruzlewski, Rob Readings, Jillian Whiting, Carly Waters, Frank Warrick, Melissa Downes and Wendy Kingston. Paul Burt presented the weather until he joined Seven News Brisbane in 2013.

Until the launch of the rival Seven News Gold Coast service in July 2016, Nine was the only metropolitan network to produce a local bulletin for the Gold Coast. The Nine bulletin retained its ratings lead until July 2019, when the Seven bulletin officially became the number one news bulletin in the northern Gold Coast (the Gold Coast sub-region of the Brisbane market).

 NBN News NBN News is a regional news service for Northern NSW and Gold Coast that is part of Nine News, airing from 6:00pm to 7:00pm seven nights a week. The news service employs 60 staff and produces over 20,000 local news stories annually, combined with news reports from Nine News; with local stories in all of its sub-markets. It includes national, state and local news stories over its hour, along with local opt outs for sport and weather. NBN News is presented from the networks Newcastle studios by Natasha Beyersdorf and Gavin Morris (weeknights) and Jane Goldsmith (weekends) with sports presenters Mitchell Hughes (Sunday - Wednesday) and TBD (Thursday, Friday and Saturday) and weather presenter Gavin Morris (weeknights). Fill in presenters include Jane Goldsmith and Tyson Cottrill (news) and Adam Murray (sport).

NBN News traces its origins back to 1962, when the bulletin was launched from its historic Mosbri Crescent studios as a half hour news bulletin originally presented by Murray Finlay, who was NBN's first newsreader. A decade later, the bulletin was expanded to one hour and Ray Dinneen joined Finlay at the newsdesk. Dinneen eventually went on to become the main anchor and was joined over the years by Tracey Reid, Chris Bath, Melinda Smith and finally Natasha Beyersdorf before retiring on 17 December 2010 and was replaced by Paul Lobb. As an independent station, the bulletin had a distinct look to Nine News with its own studio, set, graphics and theme. Following the merging of NBN into Nine, the bulletins on air presentation was refreshed to bring into line with the network.

In 2021, after nearly 60 years of production, the bulletin was moved out of NBN's long time studio home of 11 Mosbri Crescent, The Hill and relocated to 28 Honeysuckle Drive, Newcastle. Following the relocation, the networks master control was relocated to QTQ Queensland, utilising the same master control that was used for Nine's regional Queensland bulletin between 2017 and 2021. The Nine News theme was formally adapted, replacing numerous themes commissioned by the station in the last 60 years and the bulletin was integrated into Nine News.

On 13 December 2021, it was announced that longtime anchor Paul Lobb would be made redundant after a decade as weeknight news presenter and almost 30 years with the network. Lobb left immediately after the announcement. Gavin Morris will replace Lobb as weeknight news presenter and one of the networks main male personalities in addition to presenting the weather.

On 20 January 2023, weekend sports presenter Kate Haberfield announced her departure from the network after 14 years. She finished her role on the same night. A replacement sports presenter is yet to be announced.

 Tasmania Nine News Tasmania is an upcoming regional news service for Tasmania. Announced at Nine's 2023 upfront presentations, the bulletin will air from 6:00pm to 7:00pm seven nights a week on TVT Tasmania, on-par with Nine's other flagship bulletins. The bulletin will be presented from a new studio in Hobart and will cover news from across the state with local bureaus located in Launceston and the North West Coast.Nine News Tasmania will replace the bulletin currently produced by WIN Television, owners of TVT Tasmania. WIN News Tasmania previously aired as a composite bulletin featuring local and network-supplied national and international news but was gradually scaled back to a half-hour weeknight local bulletins.

Other programs

TodayToday is broadcast weekdays from 5:30am to 9am, live from TCN studios in North Sydney and is presented by Karl Stefanovic and Sarah Abo, news and entertainment presenter Brooke Boney, sport presenter Alex Cullen and weather presenter Tim Davies.

 Today Extra 

Today Extra is the network's morning talk show, hosted by David Campbell and Sylvia Jeffreys with news presenter Davina Smith from TCN studios in North Sydney. The show airs between 9:00am and 11:30am weekdays and follows the Nine Network's breakfast news program Today, with both programs closely interlinked.

Weekend TodayWeekend Today is broadcast weekends from 7am to 10am from TCN studios in North Sydney and is presented by Clint Stanaway and Jayne Azzopardi, news presenter Lizzie Pearl, entertainment presenter Richard Wilkins and weather presenter Dan Anstey.

A Current AffairA Current Affair is presented from TCN studios in North Sydney by Allison Langdon (Monday - Thursday) and Deborah Knight (Friday & Saturday).

60 Minutes60 Minutes is presented by Liz Hayes, Tara Brown, Tom Steinfort and Amelia Adams.

Former programsNightline (1992–2008, 2009–2010)Nine News: Sunday AM (2008–2009)Sunday (1981–2008)This Afternoon (2009)Financial Review Sunday (2013–2014)

 Nine News Local (2017–2021) 
As part of the affiliation relationship formed between Nine and Southern Cross Austereo in 2016, local news services were gradually rolled out on Southern Cross' regional Nine stations in 2017 in Queensland, the Australian Capital Territory, southern New South Wales and Victoria.

In August 2016, the director of Nine's news and current affairs division, Darren Wick announced that Queensland news director Mike Dalton had been appointed to head the new "Nine News Regional" division to initiate the regional news services. Up until the launch of the bulletins, the coverage areas received short updates throughout the day, produced from Southern Cross's in-house newsroom in Canberra.

The bulletins were produced and presented from Nine's studio facilities in Brisbane, Sydney and Melbourne. At launch, the bulletins were based on the format of NBN News in northern New South Wales (a station owned by Nine) as weekday composite bulletins combining international, national and state news with pre-recorded opt-outs for local news, sport and weather for each individual market. On weekends, these regions received a simulcast of their respective metropolitan-based bulletins.

On 17 March 2020, production on the composite bulletins were suspended indefinitely, due to the COVID-19 pandemic, with reporters deployed to the metropolitan bulletins in Sydney, Melbourne and Brisbane. On 29 July 2020, it was announced that the bulletins would return on 10 August with the region-specific composite bulletins replaced by half-hour statewide regional news; this new format was broadcast weekdays at 5:30pm as Nine News Local, leading into the metro-based bulletins at 6:00pm. It also announced that Natassia Soper would replace Vanessa O'Hanlon as presenter of the southern New South Wales and ACT bulletin, with Jo Hall and Samantha Heathwood returning to their respective regional bulletins.

Following the announcement that former affiliate WIN Television would be carrying Nine programming from July 2021, it was announced that the regional bulletins of Nine News Local (produced for affiliate SCA) would cease production at the end of June. The Queensland, southern NSW and Victorian editions of Nine News Local aired for the final time on Wednesday 30 June 2021, with WIN's own regional news bulletins effectively replaced Nine News Local on 1 July 2021.

 Southern New South Wales and ACT 

The southern New South Wales and ACT bulletin was presented from the TCN studios in North Sydney (originally presented from TCN's studios in Willoughby until November 2020 when TCN relocated to North Sydney) by Natassia Soper with weather presenter Gavin Morris at the Mosbri Crescent studios in Newcastle. The bulletin was also broadcast to regional viewers on CTC.

Fill-in presenters for the bulletin included Davina Smith and Jane Goldsmith (news/sport) and Hannah McEwan (weather).

Vanessa O'Hanlon was the inaugural presenter of this area's composite bulletins when they launched weekly throughout February 2017, with the Canberra and ACT bulletin launching in the first week of the month, before rolling out to Wollongong and the Illawarra in the second week, followed by a Central West bulletin for Orange, Bathurst and Dubbo in the third week, and finishing with Wagga Wagga and the Riverina in the fourth week.

 Regional Victoria 
The regional Victorian bulletin was presented from the GTV studios in Docklands by Jo Hall with weather presenter Gavin Morris at the Mosbri Crescent studios in Newcastle. The bulletin was also broadcast to regional viewers on GLV/BCV.

Fill-in presenters for the bulletin included Brett McLeod and Dougal Beatty (news/sport) and Hannah McEwan (weather).

The regional Victorian composite bulletins launched weekly throughout March 2017, with the Ballarat and western Victoria bulletin launching in the first week on 6 March, Bendigo and central Victoria in the second week, a Border North East bulletin for Albury–Wodonga and Shepparton in the third week, and finishing with the Gippsland bulletin in the fourth week.

 Regional Queensland 
The regional Queensland bulletin was presented from the QTQ studios in Mount Coot-tha by Samantha Heathwood with weather presenter Gavin Morris at the Mosbri Crescent studios in Newcastle. The bulletin was also broadcast to regional viewers on TNQ.

The regional Queensland composite bulletins were launched throughout July and August 2017; they were originally presented solo by Samantha Heathwood, with sport presenter by Paul Taylor. The Cairns and Far North Queensland bulletin launched first on 10 July, followed by Townsville and North Queensland on 17 July, Mackay on 24 July, Rockhampton and Central Queensland on 31 July, Wide Bay on 7 August, Toowoomba and the Darling Downs on 14 August, and finishing with the Sunshine Coast bulletin on 21 August.

The composite bulletins for Mackay and Toowoomba/Darling Downs were axed on 15 February 2019; from 18 February, Toowoomba and the Darling Downs received the metropolitan Brisbane bulletin.

Nine News at 7Nine News at 7 was a short-lived bulletin that aired weeknights at 7:00 pm on Nine's high definition multi-channel GEM (now 9Gem). The bulletin launched in August 2013 and was initially presented by Peter Overton from Monday to Thursday and Georgie Gardner on Friday, Later the bulletin was presented by Sylvia Jeffreys. It was launched both in response to the Seven Network's similar bulletin Seven News at 7.00 and to provide additional coverage of the unfolding 2013 federal election. The bulletin was axed on 28 October 2013.

Nine News NowNine News Now was a news magazine program that aired at 3:00pm on weekdays and presented from the network's Sydney studios by Amber Sherlock (Monday – Thursday) and Belinda Russell (Friday). 
 
The program mixed news coverage with entertainment news and topical discussions.

The bulletin went on hiatus in November 2019, with UK game show Tipping Point'' airing in its place. The bulletin did not return upon the commencement of the 2020 ratings season.

See also
, 2020

References

External links
 

 
Nine Network original programming